Balachandran Gajatheepan is a Sri Lankan Tamil teacher, politician and provincial councillor.

Gajatheepan was educated at Jaffna Hindu College and Kopay Teacher Training College. He was a teacher at Analativu Sathasivam Maha Vidyalayam and Union College, Tellippalai. He is leader of the Illankai Tamil Arasu Kachchi's youth wing.

Gajatheepan contested the 2013 provincial council election as one of the Tamil National Alliance's candidates in Jaffna District and was elected to the Northern Provincial Council. After the election he was appointed to assist the Chief Minister on tourism. He took his oath as provincial councillor in front of Chief Minister C. V. Vigneswaran at Veerasingam Hall on 11 October 2013.

References

External links
 

1982 births
Alumni of Jaffna Hindu College
Illankai Tamil Arasu Kachchi politicians
Living people
Members of the Northern Provincial Council
People associated with Union College, Tellippalai
People from Northern Province, Sri Lanka
Sri Lankan Tamil politicians
Sri Lankan Tamil teachers
Tamil National Alliance politicians